All-National Television  (Obshchenatsional'noe Televidenie, ONT; , Ahuľnanacyjanaľnaje teliebačannie, ANT) is  Belarus's second state-owned television station. It was established on 15 February 2002 by decree of the President of Belarus. It replaced relays of Channel One and currently broadcasts most of the channel's content.

History 
ONT was established by decree of the president on February 15, 2002. The channel used the frequencies formerly used by relayers of Channel One.

The Minsk Executive Committee officially registered ONT on March 19, 2002.

Broadcasts commenced on June 25, 2002, at 20:35. The first show seen on the new channel was Nashe Novosti (Our News), ONT's main news programme. The first edition was hosted by Alexander Averkov. Initially it relayed ORT's programming most of the time with significant differences in advertising breaks and news operation, as well as programming from a few other federal Russian channels (NTV, TNT, RTR). As the years progressed, the channel added more original content.

Nashe Utro (Our Morning) first went on the air on February 3, 2004.

Between February 2007 and November 2008, it attempted 24-hour broadcasting, using the overnight hours to broadcast films and a short edition of Nashe Novosti at 3am.

In late 2009 ONT was expected to be given the rights to select Belarus entry for the Eurovision Song Contest 2010 after a decision of president Alexander Lukashenko. On August 1, 2009 ONT got the rights to host the 2010 national selection.

On October 9, 2013, ONT launched a second channel broadcasting exclusively to the internet, ONT.BY, airing ONT's original productions.

On March 21, 2016, ONT became one of the first main Belarusian channels to switch to widescreen.

Programming 

ONT relays most of Channel One's shows, such as Vremya, Pole Chudes, Smak, Zhdi Menya (Wait For Me) among others, as well as having a significant amount of local productions like the nightly news bulletin Nashe Novosti (Our News), which airs directly after Vremya, morning talk-show Nashe Utro (Our Morning), a local version of Chto? Gde? Kogda?, among others.

When Channel One shows are broadcast, a dual logo, consisting of Channel One's logo on top of ONT's is used.

References

External links
Общенациональное телевидение official webpage 

Television stations in Belarus
Television channels and stations established in 2002
2002 establishments in Belarus
Propaganda in Belarus